Danyell Elaine Wilson (born July 16, 1974) is a former U.S. Army soldier and former member of the 3rd U.S. Infantry Regiment, best known as the prestigious "The Old Guard” or Honor Guard Company sentinel of Company E, 4th Battalion.

She is the first-ever African American female tomb guard for the Tomb of the Unknown Soldier (Arlington), a historic US monument at Arlington National Cemetery which honors the unidentified remains of three combatants from World War I, World War II and the Korean War. Accordingly, Wilson is the first African American woman to earn the prestigious Guard, Tomb of the Unknown Soldier Identification Badge.

She is the second woman to have earned the tomb guard badge. In 1996, Sergeant Heather Lynn Johnsen was the first woman to serve as a Tomb Guard.

Early life
Wilson was born on July 16, 1974 in Montgomery, Alabama.

Military service, tomb guard sentinel
In  February 1993, Wilson enlisted in the U.S. Army.  She served as a military police officer for the Military Police Company, 3rd U.S. Infantry (The Old Guard). After rigorous eight-month training, Wilson became a member of the Honor Guard Company of The Old Guard, one of the  U.S. Army’s most prestigious units.

On January 22, 1997, Wilson became the  first African American female tomb guard for the Tomb of the Unknown Soldier (Arlington), a historic US monument at Arlington National Cemetery which honors the unidentified remains of three combatants from World War I, World War II and the Korean War.

At the time, Wilson was the second woman and one of only 400 soldiers to have earned the prestigious Guard, Tomb of the Unknown Soldier Identification Badge since its creation in 1958. Sgt. Heather Lynn Johnsen was the first woman to serve as a Tomb Guard. Prior to 1993, the US Army prohibited women from serving guard duty at the Tomb of the Unknowns.

Honors
In 2018, the US Army Women’s Hall of Fame inducted Wilson as a member of its Hall of Fame as part of a consortium of four Female Sentinels at the Tomb of Unknowns.

References

Living people
People from Montgomery, Alabama
Military personnel from Montgomery, Alabama
Arlington National Cemetery
1974 births